Several jurisdictions in the U.S. state of Ohio have established domestic partnerships for same-sex couples. The fate of these partnerships remains uncertain since marriage has become available to all couples.

Local level

Columbus
In December 1998, the Columbus City Council approved benefits for domestic partners, then two months later unanimously repealed them after residents threatened a referendum.

On July 30, 2012, the Columbus City Council approved benefits for domestic partners. It went into effect on August 29, 2012.

Cleveland Heights
On April 15, 2002, the Cleveland Heights City Council approved, by a 6-1 vote, of a domestic partnership registry for cities employees. It went into effect on May 15, 2002.

On November 4, 2003, voters in Cleveland Heights approved Issue 35, which created a municipal domestic partnership registry in the city. The domestic partnership registry went into effect on January 26, 2004.

Toledo
On November 13, 2007, the Toledo City Council approved, by a 10-2 vote, of a domestic partnership registry in the city. On November 21, 2007, Mayor Carty Finkbeiner signed it into law. It went into effect on December 21, 2007.

Cleveland
On December 8, 2008, the Cleveland City Council approved, by a 13-7 vote, of a domestic partnership registry in the city. On December 10, 2008, Mayor Frank G. Jackson signed it into law. It went into effect on April 9, 2009.

Yellow Springs
On September 8 and September 21, 2009, the Yellow Springs Village Council voted 5–0 in favor of a domestic partnership registry in the city.

Franklin County
On August 18, 2009, the Franklin County commissioners approved of a domestic partnership registry in the county. It went into effect on January 1, 2010.

Athens
On July 1, 2011, the Athens City Council approved of a domestic partnership registry in the city. It went into effect on June 16, 2011.

Dayton
On May 2, 2012, the Dayton City Council unanimously approves of a domestic partnership registry in the city. It went into effect on June 1, 2012.

Cincinnati
On May 2, 2012, the Cincinnati City Council approved, by an 8-1 vote, of a domestic partnership registry in the city. It went into effect on June 1, 2012.

Cuyahoga County
On February 14, 2012, the Cuyahoga County Council approved, by a 6-4 vote, of a domestic partnership registry in the county.

Oberlin
On September 21, 2012, the Oberlin City Council unanimously approves of a domestic partnership registry in the city. It went into effect on October 17, 2012.

Lakewood
In October 2013, the city of Lakewood said it would extend domestic partnerships benefits in the city in 2014.

See also
LGBT rights in Ohio
Same-sex marriage in Ohio

References

LGBT in Ohio
Ohio domestic partnership
LGBT rights in Ohio